Sar RNA is an antisense non-coding RNA that is partly responsible for the negative regulation of antirepressor synthesis during development of bacteriophage P22. The target of Sar RNA is ant mRNA. Structurally, Sar RNA forms two stem-loops.

References

External links 
 

Antisense RNA